Acropora humilis, also known as finger coral, is a species of acroporid coral found in the Gulf of Aden, the Red Sea, the northern and southwestern Indian Ocean, Australia, the central Indo-Pacific, Japan, southeast Asia, the East China Sea, the central and western Pacific Ocean, the Johnston Atoll and the northwestern Hawaiian Islands. It also occurs in the Raja Ampat Islands, Mariana Islands, Palau, and the Pitcairn Islands.

Description
The species is found in digitate colonies of thick tapering branches. The branches contain one or more axial corallites that are large and dome-shaped, and either incipient axial corallites or branchlets at their bases. Its radial corallites are found in two different diameters, the larger of which are organised in rows. It is mainly cream, blue, brown or purple in colour and the branches have cream or blue tips.

Distribution
It is classed as a Near Threatened species on the IUCN Red List and it is believed that its population is decreasing; the species is also listed under Appendix II of CITES. Figures of its population are unknown, but is likely to be threatened by the global reduction of coral reefs, the increase of temperature causing coral bleaching, climate change, human activity, the crown-of-thorns starfish (Acanthaster planci) and disease. It occurs in the Gulf of Aden, the Red Sea, the northern and southwestern Indian Ocean, Australia, the central Indo-Pacific, Japan, southeast Asia, the East China Sea, the central and western Pacific Ocean, the Johnston Atoll and the northwestern Hawaiian Islands. It is present in the Raja Ampat Islands, Mariana Islands, Palau, and the Pitcairn Islands.

Taxonomy
It was described as Madrepora humilis by Dana in 1846.

References

Acropora
Corals described in 1846
Near threatened animals